The 1904–05 season was the 13th in the history of the Western Football League.

Plymouth Argyle were the champions of Division One for the first time, and along with all the other members of Division One, also competed in the Southern League during this season. The Division Two champions were Bristol Rovers Reserves, who completed the season unbeaten in the league.

Division One
Two new clubs joined Division One, which was increased to 11 clubs from nine.
Fulham
Millwall rejoining the league

Division Two
One new club joined Division Two, which remained at 10 clubs after Paulton Rovers left to join the Somerset Senior League.
Chippenham Town

References

1904-05
1904–05 in English association football leagues